John O'Halloran (born 1943 in Blackrock, County Cork, Ireland) is an Irish former sportsperson. He played hurling with his local clubs UCC and Blackrock and was a member of the Cork senior inter-county team from 1963 until 1969.

Playing career

Club

Inter-county
O'Halloran first came to prominence on the inter-county scene with Cork in 1963.  He made his senior championship debut that year in the Munster semi-final against Tipperary. It was a bleak period for the Cork hurling team.

After losing back-to-back Munster finals to Tipperary in 1964 and 1965, O'Halloran's Cork team returned to centre stage in 1966. That year 'the Rebels' avoided Tipperary in the provincial championship and qualified for a Munster showdown with Waterford. An entertaining hour of hurling followed, however, victory went to Cork by 4-9 to 2-9 for the first time in ten years. It was O'Halloran's first senior Munster winners' medal.  This victory allowed Cork to advance directly to the All-Ireland final where arch-rivals Kilkenny provided the opposition. It was the first meeting of these two great sides since 1947 and ‘the Cats’ were installed as the firm favourites. In spite of this a hat-trick of goals by Colm Sheehan gave Cork a merited 3-9 to 1-10 victory over an Eddie Keher-inspired Kilkenny.  It was O'Halloran's first All-Ireland winners' medal.

Tipperary emerged as the Munster champions in both 1967 and 1968, however, Cork were back in 1969. That year O'Halloran's side breezed through the Munster campaign and the team qualified to meet Tipperary in the final. Cork were out to avenge the nine-point defeat administered by the same side in 1968 while Tipp were out to capture a third provincial title in-a-row. The game was a major triumph for Cork as ‘the Rebels’ won by 4-6 to 0-9. It was a victory that made up for all the beatings that Tipp had dished out to Cork in the early part of the decade and it gave O'Halloran a second Munster winners’ medal. Once again this victory paved the way for an All-Ireland showdown with Kilkenny. The game was there for the taking for Cork, particularly after Kilkenny forward Pat Delaney left the field on a stretcher. ‘The Rebels’ led ‘the Cats’ coming into the last quarter, however, Kilkenny scored five unanswered points in the last seven minutes to win by 2-15 to 2-9.  O'Halloran's inter-county career ended following this defeat.

References

1943 births
Living people
UCC hurlers
Blackrock National Hurling Club hurlers
Cork inter-county hurlers
Munster inter-provincial hurlers
All-Ireland Senior Hurling Championship winners